State Road 137 (NM 137) is a  state highway in the US state of New Mexico. NM 137's southern terminus is at the Texas–New Mexico state line, where it becomes Dog Canyon Road as it enters Guadalupe Mountains National Park. Its northern terminus is at U.S. Route 285 (US 285) northwest of Carlsbad.

Major intersections

See also

References

137
Transportation in Eddy County, New Mexico